Pravin Mahadeo Thipsay (born 12 August 1959) is an Indian chess player who holds the FIDE title of Grandmaster. He is the first Indian to get a chess Grandmaster norm and the first Indian to win the Commonwealth Chess Championship.

In 1984, the Government of India conferred its highest sports award, the Arjuna Award on him.

He won the Indian Chess Championship in 1982, 1984, 1985, 1989, 1992, 1993 and 1994 and played for India in the Chess Olympiads of 1982, 1984, 1988, 1992, 1994, 1998 and 2002.

He was the Joint Silver Medalist in the Commonwealth Chess Championship in 1986 (London), in 1989(London), in 1991 (London), in 1994 (London), in 1996 (Kolkata, India), while he won the bronze medals in the Commonwealth Chess Championship in 1999 (Bikaner, India), in 2000 (Sangli, India) and in 2004 (Mumbai, India).
He was also the Individual Gold Medalist in Asian Teams Chess Championships in 1983 (New Delhi, India) and in 2003 (Jodhpur, India)

In 1985, Thipsay tied for first with Kevin Spraggett in the Commonwealth Chess Championship. In 1998, he tied for 4-7th with Sergey Zagrebelny, Mohamad Al-Modiahki and Amanmurad Kakageldyev in the Asian Chess Championship in Tehran, in 2004 tied for 2nd–6th behind Marat Dzhumaev in Pune and in the same year tied for 2nd–3rd with Saidali Iuldachev and Chakkravarthy Deepan in Lucknow. In 2007, he won the FIDE Rated All India Open Chess Tournament in Mangalore.

According to Chessmetrics, at his peak in August 1981 Thipsay's play was equivalent to a rating of 2571, and he was ranked number 141 in the world. His best single performance was at Brighton (BCF Championship) 1984, where he scored 6,5 of 10 possible points (65%) against 2549-rated opposition, for a performance rating of 2623. In the January 2009 FIDE list, he has an Elo rating of 2469, making him India's number 24.

In 1997 he became the third Indian to attain the Grandmaster title after Anand and Dibyendu Barua

He used to play on FIDE online arena with the username "Thipsay" and on ChessCube with the username "Hyunthi".

Pravin Thipsay is married to Woman International Master Bhagyashree Sathe Thipsay.

See also 
 Abhay Thipsay
 Akshayraj Kore
 Abhijit Kunte
 Nadig Kruttika
 Soumya Swaminathan (chess player)
 Eesha Karavade
 Dibyendu Barua

References

External links
 
 
 Pravin Thipsay - Articles - New In Chess

1959 births
Living people
Indian chess players
Chess grandmasters
Chess Olympiad competitors
Recipients of the Arjuna Award